Maud Elizabeth Charlesworth (September 13, 1865 – August 26, 1948) later changed her name to Maud Ballington Booth, was a Salvation Army leader and co-founder of the Volunteers of America.

Biography
She was born in Limpsfield, near Oxted, Surrey, England, the daughter of the local Anglican rector. One of three girls, she was a sister to bestselling romance novelist, Florence L. Barclay. When she was four, her father, Rev. Samuel Charlesworth, moved his family to Limehouse in London. The work of both her parents there in social issues led to Maud’s interest for social welfare and social service. In 1882, she became a companion of Miss Catherine Booth in organizing a branch of the Salvation Army in Paris. In 1883, they went to Geneva, Switzerland, where they were both expelled after aggressive police interrogation. She stayed with the Booth family and worked in the London slums and elsewhere until her marriage to the second son of the founder of the Salvation Army, Ballington Booth in 1886, against her father's wishes.

In 1887, she took command of the Salvation Army forces in the United States alongside her husband, Ballington Booth. She was also active and successful  in slum mission work in New York City.  In 1895, Booth became a naturalized American citizen.  She lived in Kew Gardens, Queens.

In 1896, Ballington and Maud left the Salvation Army after a dispute with General Booth, to co-found the Volunteers of America. Maud was also known for working to improve the conditions of prisons in the late 19th and early 20th centuries.  She later toured on the Chautauqua circuit, moving audiences with her vivid account of life in prisons and calls for reform.  Among the other causes she embraced was the legalization of euthanasia.

Selected works
 Branded (1897)
 Lights of Child-Land (1902)
 After Prison —What? (1903)
 Twilight Fairy Tales (1906)

References

External links

Maud Charlesworth (Mrs. Ballington) Booth From a scrapbook in the Carrie Chapman Catt Collection in the Rare Book and Special Collection Division at the Library of Congress
Maud Ballington Booth, photograph; to speak in Geneva  From a scrapbook in the Carrie Chapman Catt Collection in the Rare Book and Special Collection Division at the Library of Congress

1865 births
1948 deaths
American Salvationists
American activists
People from Oxted
English Salvationists
English emigrants to the United States
Burials at Ferncliff Cemetery
19th-century English writers
19th-century British women writers
19th-century British writers
20th-century English writers
20th-century British women writers
People from Kew Gardens, Queens